Wilfred Arnold (June 24, 1871 – September 30, 1943) was an American football coach and Illinois General Assembly member. He served as the head football coach at Knox College in Galesburg, Illinois for one season, in 1897, compiling a record of 4–4. He attended Harvard Law School from 1895 to 1896 before serving as a member of the Illinois General Assembly from 1903 to 1905.

Head coaching record

References

External links
 

1871 births
1943 deaths
19th-century players of American football
Knox Prairie Fire football coaches
Knox Prairie Fire football players
Harvard Law School alumni
People from Galesburg, Illinois
Players of American football from Illinois